Ricardo Miguel Ribeiro Ferreira (born 20 March 1982) is a Portuguese former football player.

Club career
He made his professional debut in the Segunda Liga for Académico de Viseu on 22 December 2013 in a game against Moreirense.

References

1982 births
People from Castro Daire
Living people
Portuguese footballers
Ermesinde S.C. players
A.D. Camacha players
C.D. Tondela players
Académico de Viseu F.C. players
Liga Portugal 2 players
Association football defenders
Sportspeople from Viseu District